Grande Fratello 9 was the ninth season of the reality franchise Big Brother. The show began on 12 January 2009, and concluded on 20 April 2009 and was hosted by Alessia Marcuzzi. Ferdi Berisa was the winner of the ninth season, she received a €300,000 prize.

Housemates

Nominations table

Notes
 Jerry and Leonia were exempt as they were new Housemates.
 The public was voting for housemates who they wanted to be immuned from nominations, ten housemates who received the most votes would be immune. 
 As the housemate who received the most votes from the public Alberto was told he could give immunity to any housemate that did not already have it, he chose to give immunity to Vittorio.
 In round one of nominations housemates had to nominate one of the four housemates who did not have immunity.
 Daniela was awarded immunity by the producers as they considered her to be the best at the weekly task. Because of her immunity, she was not allowed to nominate.
 Since last week's nominations were voided Big brother decided to have Marcello nominate three housemates that would face eviction. From the three housemates, Marcello chose to face eviction the other housemates would vote to save one of them.
 In round six of nominations all-female housemates were immune from eviction.
 In round seven of nominations Cristina was given immunity by Big brother, Alberto was also given immunity via a public vote.
 In round eight of nominations Siria was given immunity by Big brother.
 In round nine of nominations Ferdi had to choose three housemates who would not be immune from eviction. He chose Alberto, Monica and Vittorio. The other housemates had to choose one of the three to face the public vote.
 In round eleven of nominations all-male housemates were initially nominated for evictions and all-female housemates, who were exempt, had to vote to save one male housemate from eviction.
 In round eleven of nominations Gianluca was given immunity by Big brother.
 In round twelve of nominations Vanessa was given immunity by Big brother.
 In round fifteen of nominations all-male housemates were initially nominated for evictions and all-female housemates, who were exempt, had to vote to save one male housemate from eviction.
 In round seventeen of nominations all housemates were initially nominated for eviction however Big brother told the housemates that they could vote to save any housemate from nomination, the person who received the most votes would be safe.
 The immunity Gianluca had earned from the vote in round seventeen of nominations carried over into round eighteen.

External links
 Official site 
 World of Big Brother

2009 Italian television seasons
09